Juan Bautista Cambiaso (September 12, 1820 – June 21, 1886), also known as Giuseppe Giovanni Battista Cambiaso, was a Genoese-born explorer, admiral and sailor in the Dominican Navy. He is considered the founder of the Dominican Navy.

References 

Dominican Republic military personnel
Dominican Republic sailors
Dominican Republic people of Italian descent
People of the Dominican War of Independence

1820 births
1886 deaths
Italian expatriates in the Dominican Republic
White Dominicans